Serra Geral National Park is a national park in the states of Rio Grande do Sul and Santa Catarina, Brazil.

Location

Serra Geral National Park is in the Atlantic Forest biome.
The park was created by decree 531 of 21 May 1992, and is administered by the Chico Mendes Institute for Biodiversity Conservation.
The park covers parts of the municipalities of Cambará do Sul in Rio Grande do Sul and of Jacinto Machado and Praia Grande in Santa Catarina.
It is made up of two separate sections adjacent to Aparados da Serra National Park.

Environment

The park includes part of the southeast of the plateau and the escarpment between this plateau and the coastal plain.

Vegetation includes dry meadows, peat fields, cloud forests, mixed rainforests, dense submontane and montane rainforests, and lowland rainforests.
There is a wide variety of endemic species of flora.
Endemic fauna include Elachistocleis erythrogaster, Melanophryniscus cambaraensis, Thoropa saxatilis, black-and-white monjita (Xolmis dominicanus), Xanthopsar flavus, Scytalopus iraiensis, Limnornis rectirostris, and Amazona pretrei.

Conservation

The park is classified as IUCN protected area category II (national park).
It has the objectives of preserving natural ecosystems of great ecological relevance and scenic beauty, enabling scientific research, environmental education, outdoor recreation, and eco-tourism.
Protected species in the park include cougar (Puma concolor), oncilla (Leopardus tigrinus), margay (Leopardus wiedii), vinaceous-breasted amazon (Amazona vinacea), red-spectacled amazon (Amazona pretrei), Chaco eagle (Buteogallus coronatus), the toad Melanophryniscus macrogranulosus, and the fish Mimagoniates rheocharis.

Notes

Sources

1992 establishments in Brazil
National parks of Brazil
Protected areas of Rio Grande do Sul
Protected areas of Santa Catarina (state)